The 2015 Minnesota Golden Gophers football team represented the University of Minnesota in the 2015 NCAA Division I FBS football season. They were led by fifth-year head coach Jerry Kill, who resigned on October 28, 2015 due to health reasons. Tracy Claeys replaced Kill on an interim basis and was named head coach two weeks later on November 11. The Gophers played their home games at TCF Bank Stadium. They were a member of the West Division of the Big Ten Conference. Minnesota finished the regular season with a record of 5–7, 2–6 in Big Ten play to finish in a tie for fifth place in the West Division. Despite finishing below .500, the Gophers were invited to the Quick Lane Bowl versus Central Michigan due to there not being enough bowl eligible teams and Minnesota's high Academic Performance Rating. Minnesota defeated Central Michigan 21–14 to finish the season 6–7.

Recruiting

Schedule
Minnesota faced all six Big Ten West Division opponents: Illinois, Iowa, Nebraska, Northwestern, Purdue, and Wisconsin. The Gophers also faced Big Ten East Division opponents Michigan  and Ohio State.  Minnesota played four non-conference games: TCU of the Big 12 Conference, Colorado State of the Mountain West Conference, and Kent State and Ohio of the Mid-American Conference. Minnesota had one bye week during the season between their games against Nebraska and Michigan.

Roster

Players into the NFL

References

Minnesota
Minnesota Golden Gophers football seasons
Quick Lane Bowl champion seasons
Minnesota Golden Gophers football